Everaldo Batista or simply Everaldo (born 7 June 1974) is a Brazilian former footballer.

Club career 

Everaldo has played for several clubs in Brazil, including União São João, Clube Atlético Mineiro, Sport Club do Recife and Náutico. He also had spells with SpVgg Greuther Fürth and LR Ahlen in the German 2. Bundesliga. He joined LR Ahlen on a two-year contract in July 2002, but left the club after appearing in only three league matches.

References

External links 

 websoccer
 Profile 
 Guardian's Stats Centre

1974 births
Living people
Brazilian footballers
União São João Esporte Clube players
Clube Atlético Mineiro players
Sociedade Esportiva Palmeiras players
Sport Club do Recife players
Criciúma Esporte Clube players
Clube Náutico Capibaribe players
Clube Atlético Bragantino players
Itumbiara Esporte Clube players
SpVgg Greuther Fürth players
Rot Weiss Ahlen players
Borussia Dortmund II players
2. Bundesliga players
People from Camaçari
Association football defenders
Esporte Clube Metropol players
Sportspeople from Bahia